Andrew James Carleton (born June 22, 2000) is an American professional soccer player who plays for Las Vegas Lights in the USL Championship. Carleton has featured on several United States youth national teams.

Early life 
Carleton was born in Powder Springs, Georgia and at the youth level played for Georgia United.

Personal life 
Carleton has two brothers named Alan and Johnny and two sisters named Erin and Erica. Alan plays for Atlanta United's youth team, Erin plays for Concorde Fire FC, and Johnny and Erica play for Southern Soccer Association.

Professional career 

On June 9, 2016, Carleton signed with Major League Soccer side Atlanta United FC as a Homegrown Player. He spent the 2016 season on loan with United Soccer League side Charleston Battery.  He made his first appearance on September 7, 2016, against FC Montreal. On September 10, 2016, Carleton became the youngest American professional player in history to start a USL match. On September 17, 2016, Carleton recorded his first professional assist for the Battery.

On February 11, 2017, he made his debut for Atlanta United and scored during the second half of the team's first preseason game against Chattanooga FC.
Carleton made his MLS debut on May 20, 2017, as an 85th minute substitution against Houston Dynamo. The 16-year-old was given a standing ovation at a sold out Bobby Dodd Stadium. Andrew provided his first career assist in a 4–1 win against Vancouver on March 17, 2018.

On April 21, 2018, while on loan to Atlanta United 2, Carleton scored his first professional goal, a penalty kick in a 1–1 draw against Louisville City FC. He scored his first goal with Atlanta United's first team on June 6, 2018, vs Charleston Battery in the US Open Cup.

On January 24, 2020, Carleton was loaned to USL Championship side Indy Eleven for the 2020 season.

Following the 2020 season, Carleton was released by Atlanta on November 24, 2020.

In April 2021, Carleton joined Georgia Storm FC ahead of their first National Premier Soccer League season.

On September 11, 2021, Carleton joined Costa Rican first division club Jicaral Sercoba.

In December 2021, Carleton returned to United States to play with United Premier Soccer League club Kalonji Pro-Profile.

Carleton returned to the professional game on March 9, 2022, signing with USL Championship side San Diego Loyal. He was released by San Diego following the 2022 season.

Carleton signed with Las Vegas Lights on January 25, 2023.

Discipline issues and distractions
In 2018, Carleton was among the rising stars within the Atlanta United organization. He had seen significant playing time and had been included in the starting 18 several times. However, on the eve of the MLS Cup championship game, it was reported by local news media that Carleton had broken team curfew/rules and posted photos of drinking with friends in an Atlanta bar. This prompted disciplinary action by manager Tata Martino, who banned Carleton from dressing for the game. Carleton was also not allowed to participate in the celebration parade the following week by club management.

In early 2019, during the early months of the tenure of the new first-team manager, Dutchman Frank de Boer, there were hints of dissatisfaction in multiple statements to the media by de Boer regarding Carleton's lack of maturity and professionalism. De Boer stated, "[Carleton] is still young and he has to learn from that. And we spoke about that. He still has to grow up as a man." De Boer expressed that Carleton had the talent to succeed, but being a professional requires discipline both on and off the pitch. De Boer implied that Carleton needed to grow more in physical strength and should engage in a more substantial weight training and nutrition program.

On June 26, 2019, Atlanta United was one man short on the bench for an away match against Toronto FC due to Carleton forgetting his passport when the team met for the trip to Canada. Two days later, manager Frank de Boer announced Andrew would play with the second team until he showed improvements in his professionalism. "He's joining the USL team right now... I have no worries about his quality, but more the professional side,” said de Boer.

On August 6, 2019, Carleton entered the US Open Cup semifinal against Orlando City in the 48th minute, replacing Ezequiel Barco. This was Carleton's first action with Atlanta United since the lost-passport incident in late June 2019. Carleton finished out the match in which Atlanta United won 2–0 over Orlando, advancing to the US Open Cup Final for the first time in club history. After the match it was reported that manager Frank de Boer stated that Carleton earned the minutes with his recent good play with the Atlanta United 2 reserve team and his work ethic during training.

Career statistics

Honors

Club

Atlanta United 

 MLS Cup: 2018

Continental 
 Campeones Cup
 Winner: 2019

References

External links
Profile at Atlanta United

2000 births
Living people
People from Powder Springs, Georgia
Sportspeople from Cobb County, Georgia
Soccer players from Georgia (U.S. state)
American soccer players
Association football midfielders
Atlanta United FC players
Atlanta United 2 players
Charleston Battery players
Indy Eleven players
San Diego Loyal SC players
Las Vegas Lights FC players
USL Championship players
Major League Soccer players
Homegrown Players (MLS)
United States men's youth international soccer players
United States men's under-20 international soccer players
Georgia (U.S. state) Republicans
Expatriate footballers in Costa Rica
American expatriate soccer players
American expatriate sportspeople in Costa Rica
United Premier Soccer League players
National Premier Soccer League players